This is a list of episodes from the eighth and final season of Barney Miller.

Broadcast history
The season originally aired Thursdays at 9:00-9:30 pm (EST), except for three episodes (16, 17 and 18), which aired on Fridays at 8:30-9:00 pm (EST).

Episodes

References

Barney Miller seasons
1981 American television seasons
1982 American television seasons